Mantere is a surname. Notable people with the surname include:

Eeki Mantere (1949–2007), Finnish musician
Oskari Mantere (1874–1942), Finnish politician